Gary A. Nelson (born April 11, 1936) is an American former politician in the state of Washington. He served in the Washington House of Representatives and Washington State Senate as a Republican from the 21st District.

References

Living people
1930s births
Snohomish County Councillors
Politicians from Spokane, Washington
Republican Party Washington (state) state senators
Republican Party members of the Washington House of Representatives